A blaa , or Waterford Blaa, is a doughy, white bread bun (roll) speciality, particularly associated with Waterford, Ireland. It is currently made in Waterford and South Co. Kilkenny.

Blaas are sold in two varieties: "soft" and "crusty". Soft blaas are slightly sweet, malt flavour, light but firm in texture and melt in the mouth. Crusty blaas are crunchy at first bite, then chewy with a subtle malt taste and a pleasing bitter aftertaste from the well cooked, dark crust.

Eaten mainly at breakfast with butter, they are also eaten at other times of the day with a wide variety of fillings (including a type of luncheon meat often referred to as "red lead"). The breakfast blaa (egg, bacon rasher and sausage) is more common than the breakfast roll in Waterford.

A combined 12,000 blaas are sold each day by the four remaining bakeries producing blaas: Walsh's Bakehouse, Kilmacow Bakery, Barron's Bakery & Coffee House and Hickey's Bakery. Of the four remaining bakeries, only two remain in Waterford City. Blaas quickly lose their freshness and are best consumed within a few hours of purchase.

Some sources report that the blaa was introduced to Waterford at the end of the 17th century by the Huguenots.
This theory is disputed because although white flour existed in the 17th century, it was not widely used until mass production of the industrial revolution.

Blaas are sometimes confused with a similar bun known as a bap; however, blaas are square in shape, softer, and doughier, and are most notably identified by the white flour shaken over them before the baking process.

On 19 November 2013, the Waterford blaa was awarded Protected Geographical Indication status by the European Commission.

See also

 Cuisine of Ireland
 List of bread rolls
 List of breads
 List of buns

References

External links
 Specification Document for the Application of ‘Waterford Blaa PGI’
 Recipe

Buns
County Waterford
Culture in Waterford (city)
Irish breads
Irish products with protected designation of origin